Charles Johnson (23 April 1913 – 7 July 2000) was a British diver. He competed in the men's 3 metre springboard event at the 1948 Summer Olympics.

References

1913 births
2000 deaths
British male divers
Olympic divers of Great Britain
Divers at the 1948 Summer Olympics